Shadow World may refer to:

 Shadow World (role playing game), a high-fantasy campaign setting first published in 1987
 Shadow World (video game), a 1983 action game for the Atari 8-bit family
 The Shadow World: Inside the Global Arms Trade, a 2011 book by Andrew Feinstein
Shadow World (film), a 2016 documentary film based on the book